Greig Denham (born 5 October 1976) is a Scottish former professional footballer who used to play as a defender for Stenhousemuir, East Stirlingshire, Falkirk, Motherwell and St Mirren now is head coach of Rosyth since September 2022.

Career
Denham started his career at junior outfit Cumbernauld United, before getting his chance in the Scottish top-flight with Motherwell. He was to spend 6 years at Fir Park before lack of appearances forced him to leave the club. He would spend the rest of his career in the Scottish lower leagues, playing for Falkirk, St Mirren, Arbroath, East Stirlingshire and Stenhousemuir before retiring in summer of 2006.

Greig is now the head coach of East of Scotland outfit Rosyth and was appointed the Rec's manager in September 2022.

External links

Living people
1976 births
Footballers from Glasgow
Association football defenders
Scottish footballers
Motherwell F.C. players
Falkirk F.C. players
St Mirren F.C. players
Arbroath F.C. players
East Stirlingshire F.C. players
Stenhousemuir F.C. players
Scottish Premier League players
Scottish Football League players
Cumbernauld United F.C. players